Marcus Vest, known by his stage names  Channel 7 and 7 Aurelius, is an American  record producer, rapper and songwriter.

Awards
 Grammy Best Contemporary R&B Album - Ashanti - Producer/ Engineer
ASCAP Pop Music Awards
 Songwriter of the Year ("Always on Time"/"Foolish"/"I'm Real (Murder Remix)")
 Award-Winning Pop Songs ("Always on Time")
 Award-Winning Pop Songs ("Foolish")
 Award-Winning Pop Songs ("I'm Real (Murder Remix)")

Selected production and songwriting credits

Albums
 Pain Is Love by Ja Rule (All instruments by 7)

Songs

2001
 "Lost Little Girl" by Ja Rule
 "X" by Ja Rule featuring Missy Elliott & Tweet
 "Down Ass Bitch" by Ja Rule featuring Charlie Baltimore
 "Always on Time" by Ja Rule featuring Ashanti
 "Pain Is Love" by Ja Rule
 "Never Again" by Ja Rule
 "Worldwide Gangsta" by Ja Rule
 "Smokin and Ridin" by Ja Rule
 "I'm Real (Murder Remix)" by Jennifer Lopez & Ja Rule
 "Dial M for Murder" by Ja Rule
 "The Inc." by Ja Rule
 "Ain't It Funny (Murder Remix)" by Jennifer Lopez
 "When A Man Does Wrong" by Ashanti
 "Justify My Love" by Vita featuring Ashanti
 "AM to PM (Irv Gotti' Gutta Remix)" by Christina Milian
 "The Pledge" by Irv Gotti featuring Caddillac Tah & Ashanti
 "No One Does It Better" by Irv Gotti featuring Charlie Baltimore & Ashanti
 "Good Life (Remix)" by Faith Evans featuring Ja Rule, Caddillac Tah & Vita

2002
 "Intro" by Ashanti
 "Foolish" by Ashanti
 "Leaving (Always On Time Part II)" by Ashanti featuring Ja Rule
 "Call" by Ashanti
 "Rescue" by Ashanti
 "Reach for the Sky" (unreleased) by Mariah Carey
 "Baby" by Ashanti
 "VooDoo" by Ashanti
 "Movies" by Ashanti
 "Unfoolish" by Ashanti featuring The Notorious B.I.G.
 "Dreams" by Ashanti
 "Rainy Dayz" by Mary J. Blige featuring Ja Rule
 "Gangsta Lovin'" by Eve featuring Alicia Keys
 "Down 4 U" by Irv Gotti featuring Ja Rule, Ashanti, Vita & Charli Baltimore
 "Irresistible Chick" by Eve
 "Subtle Invitation" by Mariah Carey
 "The Rain" by Irv Gotti featuring Ja Rule, Jody Mack & O-1
 "Thugz Mansion (7 Remix)" by 2Pac

2003
 "I Need A Man" by Foxy Brown featuring Celeste Scalone
 "Murder Reigns" by Ja Rule featuring Celeste Scalone
 "Waiting by Loon featuring Celeste Scalone-Stoney
 "The Pledge (Remix)" by Ja Rule featuring Nas & Ashanti
 "Intro/Meledy" by Ashanti
 "Sweet Baby" by Ashanti
 "There Goes My Heart" by Mariah Carey
 "I Wanna Kiss You" by Nicole Wray

2004
 Officially Missing You by Tamia
 "Hush" by LL Cool J featuring 7 Aurelius
 "Concrete Rose Intro" by Ashanti
 "A Message to the Fans (Skit)" by Ashanti
 "Only U" by Ashanti
 "Focus" by Ashanti
 "Love Again" by Ashanti
 "U" by Ashanti
 "Every Lil' Thing" by Ashanti
 "Don't Leave Me Alone" by Ashanti (feat. 7 Aurelius)
 "Relearn Love" by Scott Stapp (w/ 7 Aurelius and The Tea Party)

2005
 "Kitty Box" by Lil' Kim

2007
 "Lollipop" by Nicole Wray
 "M-A-K-E-L-O-V-E-T-O-M-E" 7 Aurelius featuring Vanessa Carlton
 "Here's My Number Babe" 7 Aurelius featuring Ashanti
 "Drums" by Nicole Wray
 "Hey Baby (After the Club)" by Ashanti
 "Body" by Ja Rule featuring Ashley Joi

2008
 "Dr. Love" by Donnie Klang
 "Just a Rolling Stone" by Donnie Klang
 "Spank Me"
 "My House - Cassie"
 "Lay It Down"
 "Just Like Magic"
 "Tonight" by Cassie
 "Things You Make Me Do" by Ashanti featuring Robin Thicke
 "The Declaration" by Ashanti
 "Ride in My Space Ship" by James Andrew
 "She Can't Love You" by Danity Kane
 "Love in stereo" Donnie Klang

2010
 "Strobe Lights" by Diddy-Dirty Money featuring Lil' Wayne

2011
 "Strange dayz" by Ja Rule feat. 7 aurelius

2012
 "Pain Is Love 2" by Ja Rule (All instruments by 7)
Co production and additional programming by Roc the producer for 700 degrees

2018
 "Violent Crimes" by Kanye West

References

Living people
Year of birth missing (living people)
American hip hop musicians
Singers from Kentucky
Songwriters from Kentucky
Record producers from Kentucky
American rhythm and blues musicians
American hip hop record producers
Musicians from Lexington, Kentucky
Sony Music Publishing artists